Stanley Baluik (born October 5, 1935) is a former Canadian ice hockey centre and professional golfer. He played in 7 games for the Boston Bruins in the NHL during the 1959-60 season, with the rest of his hockey career spent in various minor leagues.

Hockey career
In hockey, Baluik played from 1954 to 1964 in the Ontario Hockey Association, Quebec Hockey League, Western Hockey League, American Hockey League, and National Hockey League. He won the Dudley "Red" Garrett Memorial Award as Rookie of the Year while playing with the Providence Reds of the AHL in 1959-60. He played in 7 games for the Boston Bruins in the NHL during the 1959-60 season.

Golf career
In golf, Baluik turned professional in 1955 and was club pro at the Fort William Country Club in Fort William, Ontario during the hockey off-season. In 1963, he accepted a position at the Kirkbrae Country Club in Lincoln, Rhode Island where he continues to work. He won several amateur and professional tournaments in Canada and New England, including the 1965 Vermont Open and the 1971 Rhode Island Open.

Career statistics

Regular season and playoffs

External links
 
Northwestern Ontario Sports Hall of Fame profile

1935 births
Living people
Boston Bruins players
Canadian ice hockey centres
Canadian male golfers
Golfing people from Ontario
Ice hockey people from Ontario
Kitchener Canucks players
Providence Reds players
Sportspeople from Thunder Bay
Springfield Indians players